Mohammed Khalifah Al-Saeed (born November 14, 1996) is a Saudi football player who plays as a winger and left back for Al-Fateh.

External links 
 

1996 births
Living people
Saudi Arabian footballers
Association football midfielders
Al-Adalah FC players
Al-Fateh SC players
Saudi Professional League players
Saudi First Division League players
Saudi Second Division players
Saudi Arabian Shia Muslims